Frangovo is a village in the municipality of Struga, North Macedonia.

Name 
All the forms of the toponym are derived from the form Frangovo, by reduction of the original sound cluster an into ân/ën or the denasalisation of the latter (Frangovo, Frngovo, Frgovo). The form Фрургови Власи/Frugovi Vlasi has a Serbian denasalisation of the sound cluster an > o̧ > u of which the toponym was first recorded in a medieval document of Emperor Stefan Dušan that was probably written by a Serb. This is a possessive name formed with a suffix that is derived from the ethnonym Frang/Frank meaning (Western) Europeans or someone not of the Balkans and is probably associated with the Crusades era.

History 
During the mid-fourteenth century, a document of Serbian Tsar Stefan Dušan refers to property of St Clement church in Ohrid with the settlement recorded under the name Frugovi Vlasi, which later possibly broke up into two villages identified as being modern Frangovo and nearby Mali Vlaj.

Demographics
The village of Frangovo is inhabited by Tosks, a subgroup of southern Albanians and speak the Tosk Albanian dialect.

As of the 2021 census, Frangovo had 1,206 residents with the following ethnic composition:
Albanians 1,156
Persons for whom data are taken from administrative sources 36
Others 14

According to the 2002 census, the village had a total of 1,739 inhabitants. Ethnic groups in the village include:
Albanians 1,734
Others 5

References

External links

Villages in Struga Municipality
Albanian communities in North Macedonia